Emil Argirov  (Bulgarian: Емил Аргиров; born 4 March 1987 in Plovdiv) is a Bulgarian footballer currently playing for Atletik Kuklen as a defender. He is called The Animal by the fans.

Career

Spartak Plovdiv
Argirov started training his football abilities in FC Spartak Plovdiv's youth academy. In 2006, Emil started playing for the first team. He became an irreplaceable part of the right zone of the defense of his team.

Lokomotiv Plovdiv
On 26 May 2010, Emil signed for two years with Lokomotiv Plovdiv.

Club career statistics
These statistics include domestic league, domestic cup and European tournaments.

Last update: 26 May 2010

References

External links
 Argirov on Plovdiv24
 

Bulgarian footballers
1987 births
Living people
FC Spartak Plovdiv players
PFC Lokomotiv Plovdiv players
Botev Plovdiv players
FC Lyubimets players
First Professional Football League (Bulgaria) players
Association football fullbacks